Marvyn, also spelled Marvin, is an unincorporated community located in southern Lee County, Alabama, United States. It sits at the crossroads of Alabama Highway 51 and U.S. Highway 80, and in the Lee County "panhandle" between Russell County and Macon County. It is part of the Columbus, Georgia-Alabama Metropolitan Area.

History 
Marvyn was originally located in Russell County, but was granted to Lee County in 1923 in exchange for Phenix City. A soil series is named after Marvyn, as it was first described in the area. The Marvyn soil series is described as a "fine-loamy, siliceous, thermic Typic Hapludults.

Geography

Marvyn is located at the junction of U.S. Route 80 and Alabama State Route 51 in the southern part of the county.

Demographics

Marvyn appeared on the U.S. Census in 1880 with a population of 241 residents. At the time it was located in Russell County. This was the only time it was listed on the census rolls as a separate community.

References 

Barnes, Margaret Anne (1998). The Tragedy and the Triumph of Phenix City, Alabama. Macon, Ga., Mercer University Press.

External links
 Marvyn soil series

Unincorporated communities in Alabama
Unincorporated communities in Lee County, Alabama
Columbus metropolitan area, Georgia